"1, 2 Step" is a song by American singer Ciara featuring rapper Missy Elliott for Ciara's debut album, Goodies. Written by Ciara and Missy Elliott and produced by Jazze Pha, it was released as the album's second single on November 1, 2004, in the United States. It peaked within the top 10 of the charts in several countries worldwide, including Germany, New Zealand and the United Kingdom. The song is heavily inspired by 1980s electro music production. Throughout the song, Ciara gives a description of how the song's beat feels as she exhorts party-goers to dance to the music. "1, 2 Step" was ranked 59th on Billboard's Top 100 Songs of the 2000s. In the United States, the song peaked at number two on the Billboard Hot 100 and stayed there for seven weeks.

Background and composition
"1, 2 Step" is one of four songs Ciara and Jazze Pha originally recorded at Doppler Studios in Atlanta two years before the release of Goodies. It is explained that Ciara was inspired by Roscoe Blunt, leading to the creation of this song. "The two connected so well, that half of the album was made within eight days or so." Pha asked Missy Elliott to appear on the track and she accepted. Elliott recorded her rap verse at the Hit Factory Criteria in Miami.

"1, 2 Step" is a Crunk&B track, which is strongly influenced by 1980s electro music. The song was created on one of Jazze Pha's five Akai MPC3000s. Pha used laser pulses from E-mu Proteus in the 2000s that were used for old school hip hop songs and b-boy break dance tracks. "1, 2 Step" is inspired by Afrika Bambaataa's "Planet Rock." Jazze Pha thought about how he could create a more melodic version and "shared some interesting ideas on what kind of music he would like to produce with her. Let's put it this way, it would be epic." "1, 2 Step" references her past song "Goodies" and "We Will Rock You" by Queen. Missy Elliott's verse was inspired by Teena Marie's song "Square Biz".

Critical reception
"1, 2 Step" received favorable reviews from music critics. Contact Music gave the song three out of five stars and called it "arse shaking floor filling R&B" and a "wicked melodic souful twist." Jason Birchmeier of Allmusic was published that the track is "good, if not great." Gerardo E. wrote it's "a feel good track," something that is not overproduced but works its magic." Kate Watkins of The Situation called it "a funky song in the style we have come to expect from Missy." Fazed stated that the song is about "joys of dancing around with family." Slant thought that "1, 2 Step" was a "fun dance track."

"1, 2 Step" was nominated for the 2006 Grammy Award for "Best Rap/Sung Collaboration," but lost to "Numb/Encore" by Jay-Z and Linkin Park. The song also received a nomination at the Soul Train Lady of Soul Music Awards for "Best Dance Cut." The song was nominated for "Viewer's Choice" at the 2005 BET Awards, but lost to Omarion's "O." The song won the award "Best Performed Songs in the ASCAP Repertory for the 2005 Survey Year," which included the title track from the album as well as third single, "Oh." The song won the award for "Choice Music R&B/Hip Hop Track" at the 2005 Teen Choice Awards and "Best Collaboration" and "Viewer's Choice" at the BET Awards in 2005.

Chart performance
"1, 2 Step" debuted at number 74 on the US Billboard Hot 100. on October 30, 2004. On the January 8, 2005, issue of Billboard, the song climbed to number two on the chart and stayed there for seven weeks, becoming Ciara's second top-10 single. "1, 2 Step" reached number one on the Hot Dance Airplay and Top 40 Mainstream charts. It also peaked within the top five on the Hot R&B/Hip-Hop Songs and Rhythmic Airplay charts and within the top 30 on the Hot Dance Club Play chart. "1, 2 Step" was ranked at number five for the year on the Billboard Year-End Hot 100 singles of 2005 and was certified triple platinum by the Recording Industry Association of America (RIAA) for sales of over three million digital copies in the United States.

Internationally, "1, 2 Step" was successful, reaching the top 10 in several countries. In the United Kingdom and Ireland, "1, 2 Step" entered and peaked at number three on both the UK and Irish Singles Charts. In Ireland, the single stayed at three for three weeks. The song reached number two in Australia for one week and in New Zealand for two weeks. It was a top-30 hit in Belgium (Flanders and Wallonia), France, the Netherlands, and Sweden.

Music video
The music video for "1, 2 Step" was directed by Benny Boom. It takes place in an Atlanta dance studio and on the streets. R&B boy band, B5, makes a short appearance in the video, along with Lloyd and Lil Scrappy. Ciara can be seen teaching others the song's title "one, two step" dance, which is similar to the traditional grapevine.

Synopsis
The video begins with Ciara putting her Goodies CD in a radio, setting it to the "1, 2 Step" track, and pressing the play button. As the song begins, you see Jazze Pha reciting the introduction, featuring Elliott, and then finally Ciara herself. We see Ciara and her dancers, dancing in the Atlanta dance studio, and certain shots of her teaching her female friend the "1, 2 Step". We then see a clip of Ciara meeting up with B5 and performing the "1, 2 Step". Later, Ciara is seen dancing alone on the streets. While dancing at the studio, she looks behind her, and sees Elliott in the mirror, says she is just looking things. Then Elliott begins to rap her verse and they continue dancing with each other in front of the mirror, until the songs ends. During this time, we also see shots of Ciara teaching a group of young girls the dance and also, she meets a boy who is standing in front of his house and kind of gives him a flirtatious look. We also see four skaters, three male, and one female skater, skating in the streets and a last shot of Ciara and her dancers.

Track listings

US 12-inch single
A1. "1, 2 Step" (main) – 3:22
A2. "1, 2 Step" (instrumental) – 3:22
B1. "1, 2 Step" (main) – 3:22
B2. "1, 2 Step" (acappella) – 3:14

UK CD1
 "1, 2 Step" (album version) – 3:22
 "1, 2 Step" (instrumental) – 3:22

UK CD2
 "1, 2 Step" (album version) – 3:22
 "1, 2 Step" (Delinquent "Growing Pains" remix) – 4:55
 "1, 2 Step" (Phatbelly club remix) – 3:30
 "1, 2 Step" (Eazy remix) – 5:16
 "1, 2 Step" (video)

UK 12-inch single
A1. "1, 2 Step" (album version) – 3:22
A2. "1, 2 Step" (Phatbelly club remix) – 3:30
B1. "1, 2 Step" (Delinquent "Growing Pains" remix) – 4:55
B2. "1, 2 Step" (Eazy remix) – 5:16

European CD single
 "1, 2 Step" (album version) – 3:22
 "1, 2 Step" (Johnny Budz Mixshow edit) – 4:40

Australian CD single
 "1, 2 Step" (album version) – 3:22
 "1, 2 Step" (Johnny Budz Mixshow edit) – 4:40
 "1, 2 Step" (Ford's E-Hop club mix) – 5:28
 "Goodies" (Bimbo Jones full vocal) – 7:18

Credits and personnel
Credits are taken from the UK CD1 liner notes.

Studios
 Recorded at Doppler Studios (Atlanta, Georgia) and Hit Factory Criteria (Miami)
 Mixed at Patchwerk Studios (Atlanta, Georgia)

Personnel

 Ciara – writing (as Ciara Harris), vocals
 Jazze Pha – writing (as Phalon Alexander), production
 Missy Elliott – writing, featured vocals
 Pierre Medore – vocal production
 Sam Thomas – recording
 Carlos Bedoya – recording
 Leslie Brathwaite – mixing
 Kori Anders – mixing assistant

Charts

Weekly charts

Year-end charts

Decade-end charts

Certifications

Release history

See also
 List of number-one dance airplay hits of 2005 (U.S.)

References

2004 singles
2004 songs
Ciara songs
LaFace Records singles
Missy Elliott songs
Music videos directed by Benny Boom
Song recordings produced by Jazze Pha
Songs written by Ciara
Songs written by Missy Elliott
Songs written by Jazze Pha
Sony BMG singles